Elysiah Navarro (born August 4, 2004) is an American racing driver. He currently competes in the U.S. F2000 National Championship with DEForce Racing.

Racing record

Career summary 

*Season still in progress.

Motorsports career results

American open-wheel racing results

U.S. F2000 National Championship 
(key) (Races in bold indicate pole position) (Races in italics indicate fastest lap) (Races with * indicate most race laps led)

References 

2004 births
Living people
Racing drivers from Las Vegas
Racing drivers from Nevada
U.S. F2000 National Championship drivers